Ordsall is an inner city suburb of Salford, Greater Manchester, England. The population at the 2011 census was 14,194. It lies chiefly to the south of the A57 road, close to the River Irwell, the main boundary with the city of Manchester, Salford Quays and Manchester Ship Canal, which divides it from Stretford.

Historically part of Lancashire, Ordsall was the birthplace of the bush roller chain and is home to Ordsall Hall.

History
The name Ordsall has Old English origins being the personal name Ord and the word halh, meaning a corner or nook, which has become the modern dialect word "haugh". This, indeed, describes the position of the manor of Ordsall, for its boundary on the south side is a large bend in the River Irwell, which became the site of the docks for the Manchester Ship Canal. Ordsall first appears in records in 1177 when Ordeshala paid two marks towards an aid, a feudal due or tax.

Antiquarian and Geologist, Samuel Hibbert-Ware gave a different etymology for the name; ord is a Saxon word for "primeval" or "very old" and hal meaning "den" - hence the name Ordeshal could mean "very old den". His reasoning for this was the location in the area of the cave known as Woden's Den.

Woden's Den

Before the River Irwell was deepened to make it navigable there was an ancient paved ford at Ordsall known as Woden's Ford and nearby, in a lane leading to Ordsall Hall, was a cave known as Woden's Den. The cave was of great interest to 19th-century antiquarians, but their constant trespassing to view the site prompted the landowner to completely destroy it early in the century, and no trace of the feature remains. However, the cave was described and sketched by Thomas Barret in about 1780. He postulated that, as this part of the Irwell was subject to regular flooding, travellers would have made offerings to Odin, the protector of travellers, before attempting the crossing. He also said that there were strong grounds to suppose that Cluniac monks of Lenton Priory, who had a cell called "St Leonards" at nearby Kersal, converted the cave into a Christian hermitage and served as guides to the crossing at Woden's Ford and the surrounding marshes in order to supplant the earlier pagan practices.

Regeneration project
By the 1990s, Ordsall was one of the most deprived parts of Greater Manchester, with some of the highest crime rates. In April 1994, The Independent newspaper reported that the area had unemployment above 20% (around twice the national average) and that arson and car crime were a regular occurrence. In July 1992, a riot in the area saw local gangs fire gunshots at police and fire crews.

As of 2007, the area is undergoing urban regeneration under a joint venture agreement between Salford City Council and property developer LPC Living. The "Heart of Ordsall" framework, agreed in 2005, means that over the next five years extensive environmental and infrastructure improvements will be made to the Ordsall estate at a cost of around £150 million.

The regeneration is very much community led and has already delivered a new £6.5 million primary school and children's centre. The school accommodates 315 pupils and also incorporates an 83 place children's centre providing education, health, social care and day care facilities for the local community. A dedicated street sweeper, designed by local children, cleans around Ordsall three times a week in addition to the council services as a result of local concern over litter.

Between 800 and  new homes for local families and first-time buyers will be delivered, a new community hub will cover the whole of Ordsall including Salford Quays; improvements to Ordsall Park and plans for other play areas and small open spaces are also in the pipeline for 2008.

The estate will be opened up to shoppers, with the former Radclyffe School site on Trafford Road, earmarked as a new retail centre, replacing the existing district centre. There will be new pedestrian routes and cycle lanes, visibility across the area will be improved to reduce the fear of crime, and there will be improved access to nearby Metrolink stations for the Quays and the city centre. 
 
Over £40 million has already been privately invested into the area, with the creation of hundreds of homes aimed toward first-time buyers and local residents, including Gresham Mill situated on the River Irwell, Radclyffe Mews on Taylorson Street and Quay 5, a £24 million scheme of 231 flats which sold out in just six weeks.

Transport
Ordsall Chord railway line became operational on 10 December 2017. This short railway line links Manchester Piccadilly and Manchester Oxford Road to Manchester Victoria, increasing capacity and reducing journey times into and through Manchester. It allows trains to run from Newcastle, Middlesbrough and Leeds direct to Manchester Airport without having to reverse at Manchester Piccadilly.

Economy
Despite its notorious past, Ordsall's location between Manchester city centre and Salford Quays has led to a regeneration boom. Average house prices have risen over 100% in the past 5 years, with the area in the centre of key regeneration visions such as the Irwell City Park scheme. A study commissioned by insurers More Than, published in June 2007, revealed that Ordsall had become one of the United Kingdom's property hot spots, ranking 17th out of the 35 identified. The study rated areas by looking at homes occupied by young, affluent professionals.

Landmarks
Ordsall Hall

Ordsall Hall is a Tudor mansion that was for over 300 years the home of the Radclyffe family. In more recent times it has been a working men's club and a school for clergy, the forerunner of the Manchester Theological College, amongst other uses. Like many old buildings, Ordsall Hall is said to be haunted, in particular by "the White Lady", who it is said threw herself off the balcony overlooking the Great Hall. An episode of the TV programme Most Haunted was filmed at the hall in 2002.

Salford Lads' Club

Ordsall is home to Salford Lads Club, which is featured on the inside cover of the album The Queen Is Dead by the pop band the Smiths. The club is on the corner of St Ignatius Walk and Coronation Street.

St Clement's Church

St Clement's Church is the Anglican parish church of Ordsall. The church was opened in 1877 and is now a Grade II listed building.

St Joseph's Church

St Joseph's Roman Catholic Church is one of the few buildings to have survived the Ordsall slum clearances. The church was designed by W. Randolph and cost £5,000 to build, equivalent to £ today. It was opened on Sunday 20 April 1902. The building was severely damaged during the Manchester Blitz of Christmas 1940. The interior has been largely reconstructed and modernised since then.

Education
St. Joseph's RC Primary School was rated as outstanding in its 2007 Ofsted report, and one of the 100 top performing schools in the UK. Notable developments include a new primary school for the area, Primrose Hill, as well as an inner-city academy to be affiliated with MediaCityUK at Salford Quays.

Cultural references
In 1959 a young Tony Warren got an idea of a drama set on the streets of Ordsall, which ended up into the longest running soap opera in UK history Coronation Street, the whole area since then has been demolished.

The BAFTA award-winning British comedy film East is East, released in 1999, was set in Monmouth Street, now demolished.

Notable people
Mark Addy (1838–1890), recipient of the Albert Medal (lifesaving) and a number of other honours, was the landlord of the Old Boathouse Inn, Everard Street off Ordsall Lane until his death in 1890.
Joe Gladwin, actor, best known for his role as Wally Batty in the BBC sitcom Last of the Summer Wine, was born and brought up in Ordsall. He attended Mount Carmel RC School.
Alistair Cooke, journalist and presenter of Letter from America, born in Ordsall before the family moved to Blackpool, in large part due to the young Cooke's health.
Eddie Colman, footballer with Manchester United, one of the Busby Babes who was killed in the Munich air disaster, 6 February 1958 aged 21, was born in Archie Street, Ordsall.
Alan Clarke and Graham Nash of The Hollies pop group grew up and attended school in Ordsall.
Nigel Pivaro, Coronation Street actor and journalist, lived for many years in the area and has written about it. Pivaro lived first in West Park Street as a young child, before its demolition in the mid sixties, and later returned to live in Nine Acre Court.
Tim Burgess of the band The Charlatans lived in Oldfield Road in the 1990s.
Billy Garton, Manchester United footballer, lived in Ordsall while playing for the club.
Peter Hook of the pop group New Order has many family members from the neighbourhood and was a member of Salford Lads Club.
 Paul Massey, Organised crime figure and Salford based businessman.

See also

Listed buildings in Salford, Greater Manchester

Notes

References

External links 
www.salford.gov.uk  - Ordsall housing regeneration
www.newordsall.com - LPC Living's Ordsall Regeneration Website

Areas of Salford